Rabh Boussafi (Arabic:رابح بوصافي) (born 18 May 2000) is a Qatari born-Algerian footballer. He currently plays as a winger for Al-Duhail.

Career
Boussafi started his career at Al-Duhail and is a product of the Al-Duhail's youth system. On 17 March 2018, Boussafi made his professional debut for Al-Duhail against Al-Markhiya in the Pro League, replacing Abdelrahman Moustafa.

External links

References

Living people
2000 births
Qatari footballers
Qatari people of Algerian descent
Naturalised citizens of Qatar
Al-Duhail SC players
Umm Salal SC players
Qatar Stars League players
Association football wingers
Place of birth missing (living people)